Chrysonopa is a genus of leaf beetles in the subfamily Eumolpinae. It is distributed in Asia and New Guinea.

Species
The following species are placed in the genus:
 Chrysonopa apicalis Takizawa, 1989
 Chrysonopa brunnea Jacoby, 1908
 Chrysonopa longipes (Jacoby, 1894)
 Chrysonopa metallica Bryant, 1950
 Chrysonopa nigroscutella Tan, 1988
 Chrysonopa rotundicollis (Jacoby, 1900)
 Chrysonopa tibetana Gressitt & Kimoto, 1961
 Chrysonopa viridis Jacoby, 1908

References

Eumolpinae
Chrysomelidae genera
Beetles of Asia
Beetles of Oceania
Taxa named by Martin Jacoby